In the area of modern algebra known as group theory, the Held group He is a sporadic simple group of order
   21033527317  = 4030387200
 ≈ 4.

History
He is one of the 26 sporadic groups and was found by  during an investigation of simple groups containing an involution whose centralizer is isomorphic to that of an involution in the Mathieu group M24.  A second such group is the linear group L5(2). The Held group is the third possibility, and its construction was completed by John McKay and Graham Higman.

The outer automorphism group has order 2 and the Schur multiplier is trivial.

Representations 

The smallest faithful complex representation has dimension 51; there are two such representations that are duals of each other. 

It centralizes  an element of order 7 in the Monster group. As a result the prime 7 plays a special role in the theory of the group; for example, the smallest representation of the Held group over any field is the 50-dimensional representation over the field with 7 elements, and it acts naturally on a vertex operator algebra over the field with 7 elements.

The smallest permutation representation is a rank 5 action on 2058 points with point stabilizer Sp4(4):2. 

The automorphism group He:2 of the Held group He is a subgroup of the Fischer group Fi24.

Generalized monstrous moonshine

Conway and Norton suggested in their 1979 paper that monstrous moonshine is not limited to the monster, but that similar phenomena may be found for other groups. Larissa Queen and others subsequently found that one can construct the expansions of many Hauptmoduln from simple combinations of dimensions of sporadic groups.  For He, the relevant McKay-Thompson series is  where one can set the constant term a(0) = 10,

and η(τ) is the Dedekind eta function.

Presentation
It can be defined in terms of the generators a and b and relations

Maximal subgroups
 found the 11 conjugacy classes of maximal subgroups of He as follows:

 S4(4):2
 22.L3(4).S3
 26:3.S6
 26:3.S6
 21+6.L3(2)
 72:2.L2(7)
 3.S7
 71+2:(3 × S3)
 S4 × L3(2)
 7:3 × L3(2)
 52:4A4

References

External links
 MathWorld: Held group
 Atlas of Finite Group Representations: Held group\

Sporadic groups